The 1939–40 AHL season was the fourth season of the International-American Hockey League, known in the present day as the American Hockey League. The league consisted of nine teams total. Four teams in the Eastern Division played a 54 game season, while five teams in the Western Division played a 56 game season. The Indianapolis Capitals won the F. G. "Teddy" Oke Trophy as the Western Division champions, while the Providence Reds won the Calder Cup as league champions.

Team changes 
 The Indianapolis Capitals joined the IAHL as an expansion team, based in Indianapolis, Indiana, playing in the West Division.

Final standings 
Note: GP = Games played; W = Wins; L = Losses; T = Ties; GF = Goals for; GA = Goals against; Pts = Points;

Scoring leaders

Note: GP = Games played; G = Goals; A = Assists; Pts = Points; PIM = Penalty minutes

Calder Cup playoffs

See also 
 List of AHL seasons

References 

 AHL official site
 AHL Hall of Fame
 HockeyDB
 hockeyleaguehistory.com

American Hockey League seasons
2